CarSim is a commercial software package that predicts the performance of vehicles in response to driver controls (steering, throttle, brakes, clutch, and shifting) in a given environment (road geometry, coefficients of friction, wind). CarSim is produced and distributed by an American company, Mechanical Simulation Corporation, using technology that originated at the University of Michigan Transportation Research Institute (UMTRI) in Ann Arbor, Michigan. 

The software is used by over 30 automotive manufacturers (General Motors, Toyota, Honda, Ford, etc.), over 60 suppliers, and over 150 research labs and universities. The math models simulate physical tests to allow engineers to view results that are similar to test results, but which can be obtained repeatably, safely, and much quicker than is possible with physical testing. The simulation models are often used to evaluate vehicle designs that have not yet been built. Results are visualized via animation, plotted for analysis, or exported to other software for analysis using the same methods that are applied to physical test data.

The math models replicate system-level behavior with high fidelity. They contain the major effects that determine how the tire contacts the road, and how forces from the tire/road interface are transferred through the suspension to the chassis. However, they do not have details of linkage connections or structure compliance. The models have been validated repeatedly by manufacturers for reproducing overall vehicle motions needed to evaluate handling, directional and roll stability, braking, and acceleration. On the other hand, they do not include component details needed to determine durability, fatigue, or high-frequency vibrations.

The math models are generated with a symbolic multibody code generator called VehicleSim Lisp (originally named AutoSim) that was developed by one of the company founders at UMTRI. The machine-generated code is highly optimized to achieve fast computation, such that the math models run much faster than real time. Starting in 1998, real-time versions of CarSim have been available for testing hardware in the loop (HIL). The math models are used directly in over 350 driving simulators to provide physics models that have been validated over most conditions of interest.

The main applications of the CarSim software are:
 Test engineers simulate hundreds of tests ahead of time to identify problems or clear designs that show no problems.
 Developers of advanced controls (brakes, stability, traction, etc.) test their simulated control designs with the simulated vehicle. In these applications, CarSim simulates the basic vehicle dynamic behavior as a plug-in to controller design software such as Simulink (from Mathworks), LabVIEW (from National Instruments), Activate (from solidThinking), or custom code (MATLAB, Visual Basic, C/C++, etc.)
 Car manufacturers and suppliers test actual controller hardware using real-time HIL systems.
 Researchers and others use the CarSim math models in driving simulators, ranging from low-cost systems using game controller up to full-scale large motion simulators such as the Toyota simulator.

The same technology is used in BikeSim, a program for simulating motorcycle and scooter dynamics, and TruckSim, used to simulate dynamics of commercial vehicles with dual tires, trailers, and more than two axles per unit.

References

External links
Official Website

Driving simulators